MM (titled Marisa Monte MM (Ao Vivo) on digital platforms) is an album by Brazilian singer Marisa Monte, released in 1989. It was her first album and was recorded live. It reached number one in Brasil Hot 100 Airplay.

Track listing 
 "Comida" (Arnaldo Antunes/Sérgio Britto/Marcelo Frommer)
 "Bem Que Se Quis (E Po' Che Fa')" (Pino Daniele/ versão: Nelson Motta)
 "Chocolate" (Tim Maia)
 "Ando Meio Desligado" (Arnaldo Baptista/Sérgio Dias Baptista/Rita Lee)
 "Preciso Me Encontrar" (Candeia)
 "O Xote das Meninas" (Zé Dantas/Luiz Gonzaga)
 "Negro Gato" (Getúlio Cortes)
 "Lenda das Sereias, Rainha do Mar" (Vicente Matos Dinoel/Vicente Mattos/Arlindo Velloso)
 "South American Way" (Al Dubin/Jimmy McHugh)
 "I Heard It Through the Grapevine"  (Barrett Strong/Norman Whitfield)
 (CD version only)
 "Bess, You Is My Woman Now"  (George Gershwin/Ira Gershwin/DuBose Heyward)
 "Speak Low" (Ogden Nash/Kurt Weill)

References

External links
 

Marisa Monte albums
1989 debut albums
1989 live albums